Tripartite motif-containing 24 (TRIM24) also known as transcriptional intermediary factor 1α (TIF1α) is a protein that, in humans, is encoded by the TRIM24 gene.

Function 

The protein encoded by this gene mediates transcriptional control by interaction with the activation function 2 (AF2) region of several nuclear receptors, including the estrogen, retinoic acid, and vitamin D3 receptors. The protein localizes to nuclear bodies and is thought to associate with chromatin and heterochromatin-associated factors. The protein is a member of the tripartite motif (TRIM) family. The TRIM motif includes three zinc-binding domains – a RING, a B-box type 1 and a B-box type 2 – and a coiled-coil region. Two alternatively spliced transcript variants encoding different isoforms have been described for this gene.

Interactions
TRIM24 has been shown to interact with Mineralocorticoid receptor, TRIM33, Estrogen receptor alpha and Retinoid X receptor alpha.

See also
 Transcription coregulator

References

Further reading

External links
 
 

Gene expression
Transcription coregulators